Dallas Franklin Eakins (né Yoder; January 20, 1967) is an American professional ice hockey coach and former player. He is the head coach of the Anaheim Ducks of the National Hockey League (NHL). He previously served as the head coach of the Edmonton Oilers of the NHL.

Early years
Eakins' mother, Carol Ploof, was a native of Macon, Georgia. His birth father was a Native American, Ted Yoder, who Eakins believes was Cherokee. Both parents split up shortly after his birth. Ploof later married Jim Eakins, a Canadian long-distance truck driver, and Dallas subsequently adopted his stepfather's last name.

In October 1974, Eakins' family relocated to Peterborough, Ontario. As a youth, he played in the 1980 Quebec International Pee-Wee Hockey Tournament with a minor ice hockey team from Peterborough.

Playing career
Eakins played 4 seasons in the Ontario Hockey League (OHL) for the Peterborough Petes, being named the captain in his final year and also the team's best defenseman that season. Jeff Twohey who was with the Petes for 3 decades called him the best captain the team ever had, saying "He was a great leader. He was a hard worker, loyal, tough, and never afraid to confront people. He knew how to keep players in line."

Eakins was drafted 208th overall by the Washington Capitals in the 1985 NHL Entry Draft. He went on to play 120 career NHL games, scoring no goals and 9 assists for 9 points, thus becoming the second Floridian to play in the NHL, but the first to ever record a point. Eakins is the first player 
born in the state of Florida to play for the Florida Panthers, having played for the club on two separate stints (but was raised primarily in Canada). However, the majority of Eakins career was played in the American Hockey League (AHL) and the International Hockey League (IHL). In those two leagues, Eakins played 882 games, scoring 43 goals and 179 assists for 222 points, whilst playing for 10 different teams. Eakins also won a Calder Cup and a Turner Cup as a member of the Chicago Wolves.

Eakins once made a bet with Cincinnati radio personality Dennis "Wildman" Walker of WEBN while a member of the Cincinnati Cyclones that he would not score more than 3 goals in one season. Walker stated that Eakins could shave his head at center ice of the Cincinnati Gardens if he eclipsed that mark. Eakins not only scored six goals, but did it in 30 games. The head shaving took place at center ice, prior to a game in December 1994, against the Long Beach Ice Dogs.

While serving as the captain of the Manitoba Moose in the 2003–04, Eakins switched from his number 6 to number 37, in honor of his friend and former Wolves teammate, Dan Snyder, who was killed in a car accident in Atlanta, Georgia. Snyder was a member of the Atlanta Thrashers.

Coaching career
 After retiring as a player, Eakins joined the Toronto Maple Leafs organization as an assistant coach for the Toronto Marlies and later the Maple Leafs in 2006.  In 2009, he was given head coaching duties for the Marlies.  While with the Marlies, Eakins was named as one of two head coaches representing the Western Conference for the 2011–2012 and 2012–2013 seasons AHL All-Star games.

Eakins left the Marlies in the summer of 2013 to become the head coach of the Edmonton Oilers, but was fired from his position after only 18 months on December 15, 2014.  In June 2015, the Anaheim Ducks hired Eakins as the head coach of their AHL-affiliate, the San Diego Gulls.

On June 17, 2019, the Anaheim Ducks named Eakins as franchise's 10th head coach.

Personal life
Eakins is married to actress Ingrid Kavelaars. They have two daughters together. His career is profiled in the book "Journeymen: 24 Bittersweet Tales of Short Major League Sports Careers" by Kurt Dusterberg.

Career statistics

Head coaching record

NHL

*  Shortened seasons due to the COVID-19 pandemic during the 2019–20 and 2020-21 seasons

AHL

References

External links
 

1967 births
Living people
American emigrants to Canada
American men's ice hockey defensemen
Baltimore Skipjacks players
Beast of New Haven players
Binghamton Rangers players
Calgary Flames players
Canadian adoptees
Canadian ice hockey defencemen
Chicago Wolves players
Cincinnati Cyclones (IHL) players
Edmonton Oilers coaches
Florida Panthers players
Ice hockey people from Florida
Ice hockey people from Ontario
Manitoba Moose players
Moncton Hawks players
Native American sportspeople
New York Islanders players
New York Rangers players
People from Dade City, Florida
Peterborough Petes (ice hockey) players
Phoenix Coyotes players
Sportspeople from Peterborough, Ontario
Springfield Falcons players
St. John's Maple Leafs players
St. Louis Blues players
Toronto Maple Leafs coaches
Toronto Maple Leafs players
Toronto Marlies coaches
Washington Capitals draft picks
Winnipeg Jets (1979–1996) players
Worcester IceCats players
American people of Cherokee descent
American expatriates in Canada